Cesare Zanzottera (29 June 1886 – 28 June 1961) was an Italian cyclist. He competed in two events at the 1908 Summer Olympics.

References

External links
 

1886 births
1961 deaths
Italian male cyclists
Olympic cyclists of Italy
Cyclists at the 1908 Summer Olympics
Cyclists from Milan